"Per Lucia" ("For Lucia") was the  entry in the Eurovision Song Contest 1983, performed in Italian by Riccardo Fogli.

The song is a ballad, with Fogli singing about the lengths he wants to go to in order to impress Lucia, his lover. He claims at one point, for example, that he wants to make a feast for the entire country.

The song was performed fifth on the night, following 's Carola Häggkvist with "Främling" and preceding 's Çetin Alp & The Short Waves with "Opera". At the close of voting, it had received 41 points, placing 11th in a field of 20.

It was succeeded as Italian representative at the 1984 contest by Alice & Battiato with "I treni di Tozeur".

Fogli also recorded an English-language version of the song, titled "For Lucia", which was released as a promo single.

Per Lucia (Greatest Hits album) 
Riccardo Fogli had already achieved overwhelming popularity in Italy and Spanish-language countries, and his victory at the Sanremo Music Festival 1982 made it spread worldwide. 

After Italian broadcaster RAI had chosen the artist internally as the representative in Eurovision, they decided to release a greatest hits album including Italy's entry for the contest, "" ("Everyday stories", Sanremo's winning song) and his hits from the last four studio albums at the time: "Che ne sai" (1979), "Alla fine di un lavoro" (1980), "Campione" (1981) and "Compagnia" (1982).

The compilation was released in Scandinavia and Greece and reached number 20 on the Finnish album charts in June 1983.

Covers 
 Swedish dansband Wizex covered the song on the 1983 album Julie as "Här är sången" ("Here is the song") with lyrics in Swedish by Monica Forsberg.

Charts

References

External links
  Italian lyrics of the song and its English translation

Eurovision songs of Italy
Eurovision songs of 1983
1983 songs